NightLink is the name given to the all-night TransLink services that leave Fortitude Valley, Brisbane City and Surfers Paradise on the Gold Coast late Friday and Saturday nights.

History
NightLink services started as a six-month trial in December 2005. In the first weekend, the service was so popular that TransLink had to put on extra buses to meet demand. In its first year of operation, close to 200,000 passenger trips were made on NightLink services.
Originally rail services ran on all lines in greater Brisbane; those with low patronage were discontinued in August 2006 and replaced with buses.

As of 14th October 2022, NightLink services no longer service Brunswick St, due to safety reasons.

Routes
These services help passengers get home safely after a night out. As they depart the CBD after 21:30, passengers can be dropped off anywhere along the route where it is safe to do so. There are now 23 NightLink bus routes and three NightLink train routes in operation.

Buses
NightLink bus routes run every hour from 1am to 5am and are prefixed by the letter "N". Most NightLink routes mirror the equivalent 'normal' service, although slight variations apply on some routes to maximise coverage.

Trains
NightLink trains run on the Beenleigh, Caboolture and Ipswich lines with a single service around 4am.

FlatFare Taxis
The NightLink brand also includes special "FlatFare" taxi services operating on Friday and Saturday nights. The NightLink FlatFare taxis operate from designated taxi ranks and pick up multiple passengers travelling in the same general direction. The taxis can travel as far as zone 5 of the TransLink system, and passengers are charged based on the number of TransLink zones included in their journey.

See also
TransLink
Brisbane Transport
Brisbane City Council

References

External links
TransLink
Brisbane City Council

Public transport in Brisbane
Translink (Queensland)